WITA (1490 AM, "Inspiration 1490") is a Christian radio station located in Knoxville, Tennessee. It broadcasts a Christian format with some conservative talk shows and news from the USA Radio Network.

In the late 1960s into the mid-1970s, WITA was known as WROL, "Real Rock And Roll Radio". It was the only station in Knoxville airing an AOR format, playing album cuts from artists such as the Allman Brothers, Led Zeppelin and the Grateful Dead.

The station boasted Knoxville's first female DJ to gain popularity with the University Of Tennessee student population, Leslie Shelor (Leslie Shelor Swann after marriage; also known as "Peggy Swann" to good friends). During this period it was known as "W-149" as a play on its frequency of 1490 kHz. The daytime 1-kW signal originated in Fountain City in north Knoxville, but the nighttime 250-W signal originated at a separate transmitter site which was much closer to campus.

In the mid-1970s the station switched format to top 40 as WKVQ (15Q), but found it difficult to compete with more powerful signals like WNOX and WOKI-FM. By the late 1970s the religious format had begun. 2018 Gubernatorial Libertarian candidate Vinnie Vineyard, better known as Funkmaster V from Wrestling With Ghosts, hosted an hour long rock/ comedy program entitled "Cousin Vinnie's Rock N Roll Show" on the station during 1995–1996.

External links

ITA
ITA
News and talk radio stations in the United States
Radio stations established in 1961